Marambio Base is a base and scientific research station in Argentine Antarctica

Marambio may also refer to:
 Gustavo Argentino Marambio, an Argentine aviator
 Marambio Island, in Graham Land on the Antarctic Peninsula
 Marambio Airport, that serves Marambio Base

Disambiguation pages